Rantoul is a village in Champaign County, Illinois, United States. The population was 12,371 at the 2020 census.

History
The community was named after Robert Rantoul, Jr., a U.S. representative from Massachusetts, and a director of the Illinois Central Railroad.

Rantoul was laid out in 1854 for the Illinois Central Railroad by John Penfield.  A post office was established in 1856 as Rantoul Station; the name was changed to Rantoul in May 1862.

In 1917, Rantoul was chosen by the United States Army to be the site of Chanute Field, due to its proximity to the Illinois Central railroad and the War Department's ground school at the University of Illinois. In the 1930s, Chanute Field grew, dominating the local economy as thousands of airmen were stationed there to train recruits. Renamed Chanute Air Force Base after World War II, it was closed in 1993, but was partly reoccupied by the Octave Chanute Aerospace Museum, which was permanently closed on December 30, 2015, and the Rantoul National Aviation Center. Rantoul's economy has taken a sharp decline due to the base's closing, from which it has never recovered. The book Eye of the Storm: Chanute Closes by Katy B. Podagrosi tells the story of this period.

Rantoul Family Sports Complex opened in August, 2021 as a premier amateur sports facility featuring 10 all weather baseball / softball and 8 all weather multi-purpose fields. The complex plays host to thousands of amateur teams for tournament and local play. It also serves as home field for the University of Illinois "Fighting Illini" men's lacrosse team.

Geography
Rantoul is located at  (40.304600, -88.152070).

Climate

Demographics

As of the 2020 census there were 12,371 people, 5,137 households, and 2,947 families residing in the village. The racial makeup of the village was 54.60% White, 22.50% African American, 0.61% Native American, 1.20% Asian, 0.07% Pacific Islander, 10.16% from other races, and 10.86% from two or more races. Hispanic or Latino of any race were 17.44% of the population.

There were 5,137 households, out of which 63.11% had children under the age of 18 living with them, 33.09% were married couples living together, 21.00% had a female householder with no husband present, and 42.63% were non-families. 36.81% of all households were made up of individuals, and 12.54% had someone living alone who was 65 years of age or older. The average household size was 3.35 and the average family size was 2.46.

The village's age distribution consisted of 29.6% under the age of 18, 7.5% from 18 to 24, 26.8% from 25 to 44, 23.3% from 45 to 64, and 12.8% who were 65 years of age or older. The median age was 34.3 years. For every 100 females, there were 90.0 males. For every 100 females age 18 and over, there were 87.9 males.

The median income for a household in the village was $41,837, and the median income for a family was $48,750. Males had a median income of $36,630 versus $31,197 for females. The per capita income for the village was $22,744. About 16.3% of families and 20.0% of the population were below the poverty line, including 34.3% of those under age 18 and 8.9% of those age 65 or over.

Rail transportation 

Amtrak, the national passenger rail system, provides service to Rantoul. Amtrak Train 391, the southbound Saluki, is scheduled to depart Rantoul at 11:10am daily with service to Champaign-Urbana, Mattoon, Effingham, Centralia, Du Quoin, and Carbondale. Amtrak Train 393, the southbound Illini, is scheduled to depart Rantoul at 6:00pm daily serving the same points as the southbound Saluki. Amtrak Train 390, the northbound Saluki, is scheduled to depart Rantoul at 10:27am daily with service to Gilman, Kankakee, Homewood, and Chicago. Amtrak Train 887, the northbound Illini, is scheduled to depart Rantoul at 7:02pm daily serving the same points as the northbound Saluki.

Air transportation 
Rantoul National Aviation Center

Notable people 

 Don Branson, auto racer
 Sean Bubin, offensive lineman of the Detroit Lions and New England Patriots)
 Michelle Franzen, television and radio reporter, graduated from Rantoul Township High School
 Darren W. McDew, U.S. Air Force general
 Greg McMahon, special teams coordinator for the New Orleans Saints; Rantoul native
 Harry M. McCaskrin, Illinois state legislator and lawyer
 C. Adrian Pillars, sculptor
 Jheri Redding, hairdresser, chemist, hair care products entrepreneur and businessman; best known for creating the Jheri curl.
 Alan Ritchson, actor most known for Blue Mountain State
 Blake Schilb, professional basketball player, playing for Red Star Belgrade
 Craig Vetter, innovative designer of motorcycles and motorcycle accessories, inducted into the AMA Motorcycle Hall of Fame in 1999
 Dick Williams radio reporter WRTL radio and co founder WRTL radio with Bob Brown

Activities 
, Hardy's Reindeer Ranch, Real Reindeer, Christmas Shop, Corn Maze, Pedal Carts, Pumpkin Patch, Christmas Trees, Paintball
Octave Chanute Aerospace Museum, detailing the history of Flight, Military Aviation, and Chanute Air Force Base, located on the old Base. Closed in 2015.
Korean War Veterans Museum, a Museum currently under construction detailing the history of the Korean War, located on the old Base. 
Rantoul Theater Group, offering drama, comedy, and musical live entertainment

Schools
Rantoul Township High School, the only high school in Rantoul, Illinois and stands as its own district. RTHS serves students from Rantoul, Gifford, Thomasboro, Ludlow and the surrounding rural area.  More information is provided through the provided link. The University of Illinois football scrimmage game is usually held at the high school field in August.
St. Malachy Grade School a Catholic Grade School in Rantoul, IL.
Rantoul City Schools District 137 is a Pre-K-8 District with Grade Level Centers, made up of 5 schools: Eastlawn (Pre-K-5), Pleasant Acres (Pre-K-5), Broadmeadow (Pre-K-5), Northview (Pre-K-5), and Eater (6-8).
Lincoln's ChalleNGe Academy In 1993, the Center for Strategic and International Studies published a study entitled, Forging a Military Youth Corps. That same year, Congress, acting upon the studies recommendations, provided funding in the 1993 Defense Authorization Act for the National Guard Bureau to conduct a pilot youth intervention program. The purpose of this pilot program was to determine if life coping skills and employability of a high school dropout could be significantly improved through participation in a life skills program using a military model.
University of Illinois Advanced Transportation and Research Engineering Laboratory (ATREL) ATREL is a 47-acre laboratory site where pavement, railroad, and transportation systems are researched, studied, and tested.

References

External links

Early History of Rantoul, Il (1871)
Village of Rantoul Official Site
Rantoul Area Chamber of Commerce
History of Rantoul Township

 
Villages in Champaign County, Illinois
Villages in Illinois
Parachuting in the United States
Populated places established in 1854
1854 establishments in Illinois